The Be'er Sheva Black Swarm are an amateur American football team based in Be'er Sheva, Israel. The Black Swarm compete in the Israel Football League (IFL).

History 

The Black Swarm joined the IFL in 2009 as an expansion team, along with the Judean Rebels. Despite never achieving a winning record, the Black Swarm have made the playoffs three times; losing in the first round each time. The Black Swarm play their home games at Amphipark, an outdoor amphitheater in Be'er Sheva.

References 

American football teams in Israel
American football teams established in 2009
2009 establishments in Israel
Sport in Beersheba